Hunan Mass Media Vocational and Technical College is a college located in Changsha, Hunan, China.

As of fall 2013, the college has 3 campuses, a combined student body of 9600 students.

History
The college was founded in 1949 in Changsha, Hunan. In 1969, during the Cultural Revolution, the college closed and reopened in 1979. In 2000, Hunan Bank College merged into the college.

Schools and departments
The college consists of 9 departments and 32 specialties. At present, the university has 5 research institutions and research centres.

 Department of Host and Broadcast
 Department of Network Media
 Department of Film and Television Art
 Department of Cartoon Art
 Department of Applied Art
 Department of Radio and Television Media
 Department of International Communication
 Department of Paper Media
 Department of Economic Management

Culture
 Motto: Mingde Boxue and Qiushi Zhiyuan
 College newspaper: Journal of Hunan Mass Media Vocational Technical College, founded in 2001.

Affiliated schools
 Xingsha Teacher Training School
 Xingsha Experimental School

Notable alumni
 Cao Yi
 Chen Tao
 Deng Haiming
 Du Haitao
 Gu Xiaojing
 Hua Hongguang
 Huang Rui
 Jiang Hongjie
 Li Chi
 Li Hao
 Li Hong
 Liang Lan
 Liu Diyang
 Liu Jixian
 Liu Nian
 Jin Xiaolin
 Qiu Xiao
 Qu Youyuan
 Ren Wei
 Wang Han
 Wang Yan
 Wei Zhe
 Xie Hong
 Xu Jing
 You Yizhou
 Zheng Huilin

Gallery

References

External links

Universities and colleges in Hunan
Educational institutions established in 1949
Education in Changsha
1949 establishments in China